Hutt Valley United was a short-lived association football club from New Zealand. A composite team, the club was founded in 1987 ostensibly to represent the interests of several senior teams from the Hutt Valley area just north of Wellington in the New Zealand National Soccer League.

Hutt Valley United played in the national league from 1987 to 1992, achieving their best result in the 1989 competition, finishing fifth. The team also reached the semi-finals of the Chatham Cup in 1990 and the quarter-finals in 1992.

The team was disbanded in 1992 at the same time as the demise of the national league, with players returning to the individual support clubs.

Defunct association football clubs in New Zealand
Association football clubs in Wellington
Sport in Lower Hutt
Sport in Upper Hutt
1987 establishments in New Zealand
1992 disestablishments in New Zealand
Hutt Valley